GAC-Stellantis, formerly GAC Fiat Chrysler Automobiles Co., Ltd. was an automobile manufacturing company headquartered in Changsha, China.  It is a 50:50 joint-venture between the GAC Group and Stellantis. The company was founded on 9 March 2010. Fiat agreed to invest an initial US$559 million in the venture.

History
Fiat and GAC signed a joint venture agreement in Rome on 6 July 2009, in the presence of Chinese President Hu Jintao and Italian Prime Minister Silvio Berlusconi. Construction of GAC Fiat facilities in Changsha began on 26 November 2009, with a groundbreaking ceremony attended by the Italian ambassador to China, the provincial leaders of Hunan and Guangdong, and city leaders of Changsha and Guangzhou. GAC Fiat Automobiles Co., Ltd. was incorporated on 9 March 2010.

The Changsha assembly plant was officially opened on 28 June 2012, in a ceremony attended by Fiat chief executive Sergio Marchionne and representatives of Hunan and Guandong provinces.

In January 2013, it was announced that GAC Fiat would be also expanded to include Chrysler, and that, GAC Fiat would construct a new assembly plant in Guangzhou for the production of Jeep products.

In January 2015, GAC Fiat was renamed as GAC Fiat Chrysler.

In January 2022, Stellantis announced a plan to take a 75% majority stake of the joint venture. GAC quickly responded that no formal agreement to change the joint venture had been signed.

In July 2022, Stellantis announced that due to a lack of progress in its attempt to take a greater stake in the company, it was terminating the joint venture with GAC. Stellantis planned to shut down local production operations and move towards importing Jeep vehicles to the Chinese market.

Operations
GAC Fiat has facilities in Changsha, with an annual production capacity of 140,000 cars and 220,000 engines, covering around 700,000 m2. Vehicle production began in June 2012, with the Fiat Viaggio four-door sedan. Later, the company started to manufacture the Ottimo (the hatchback version of the Viaggio). In October 2013, GAC Fiat announced the construction of a second manufacturing plant in Guangzhou. In November 2014, Fiat Chrysler and GAC expanded their partnership to produce Jeep vehicles. The Changsha plant began assembling the Jeep Cherokee in October 2015 and the Guangzhou plant began assembling the Jeep Renegade in April 2016. In late 2016, the Guangzhou plant began assembling the Jeep Compass.  In 2018, the Changsha plant began manufacturing the Jeep Grand Commander.

Former production

Sales figures

By year

By model

 Fiat Ottimo: 40,002
 Fiat Viaggio: 134,496
 Jeep Cherokee: 253,045
 Jeep Compass: 215,160
 Jeep Grand Commander: 43,039
 Jeep Renegade: 91,011

References

External links
 

2010 establishments in China
2022 disestablishments in China
Car manufacturers of China
Manufacturing companies based in Hunan
Defunct motor vehicle manufacturers of China
Vehicle manufacturing companies established in 2010
Vehicle manufacturing companies disestablished in 2022
GAC Group joint ventures
Stellantis
Chinese-foreign joint-venture companies
Companies based in Changsha